Pyramid Mountain is a mountain in Jasper National Park, Alberta, Canada, named for its pyramid-like shape. James Hector named the mountain in 1859 due to its appearance from the Athabasca River valley on the eastern side of the peak.

Part of the Victoria Cross Ranges in the Athabasca River Valley the mountain is in the major headwaters for the Athabasca River.

The mountain is a relatively easy scramble on the eastern slopes.

Based on the Köppen climate classification, Pyramid Mountain is located in a subarctic climate zone with cold, snowy winters, and mild summers. Temperatures can drop below -20 °C with wind chill factors below -30 °C.

See also
Geography of Alberta

References

Two-thousanders of Alberta
Mountains of Jasper National Park